The International Ornithological Committee (IOC) recognizes these 138 species in the New World sparrow family Passerellidae, distributed among 30 genera in the following sequence. One extinct species, the Bermuda towhee, is included. Confusingly, only 68 of the 138 include "sparrow" in their name. Forty-three are called brushfinches and the remaining 27 have a variety of other names. The North American and South American classification committees of the American Ornithological Society (AOS) do not recognize all of these species and also use some different common names.

This list is presented according to the IOC taxonomic sequence and can also be sorted alphabetically by common name and binomial.

References

I
American sparrows
Passerellidae